

Description 
Pleopeltis christensenii is a species of fern from the genus Pleopeltis'.

Range 
According to GBIF the plant has primarily been observed from Honduras in the north to Ecuador in the south.

References 

christensenii